Xyroptila siami is a moth of the family Pterophoridae which can be found in Thailand and China.

References

External links

Moths described in 2006
Moths of Asia
siami